The Cheyenne Frontier Days Old West Museum is located in Cheyenne, Wyoming, United States. The museum was founded in 1978. It is a 501(c)(3) non-profit organization, dedicated to interpreting, conserving and exhibiting the history and material culture of Cheyenne, Cheyenne Frontier Days, the State of Wyoming and the American West.  The museum features the Cheyenne Frontier Days Hall of Fame. Permanent exhibits include Western horse-drawn carriages and wagons, the history and memorabilia of Cheyenne Frontier Days rodeo celebration, local history of Cheyenne, pioneer artifacts and clothing, and Western and folk art. The Cheyenne Frontier Days Old West Museum is home to the "World’s Largest Outdoor Rodeo and Western Celebration" with its permanent exhibit on the history of Cheyenne Frontier Days. 

Clayton Danks, the winner of three CFD competitions prior to 1910, is the model cowboy on the horse Steamboat on the Wyoming trademark, the Bucking Horse and Rider. The saddle which Danks won in CFD competition in 1907 was donated by his surviving family members to the museum in September 2013.

Shirley E. Flynn, director of the museum from 1987 to 1991, penned the history of the Frontier Days celebration in her 1996 book Let's Go! Let's Show! Let's Rodeo! The History of Cheyenne Frontier Days.

Hall of Fame 
The Hall of Fame inducts individuals, livestock, and organizations who helped and continue to maintain the rodeo widely known as "The Daddy of 'em All." Everyone voted into the hall of fame "represents the competitive and cooperative spirit that has remained the hallmark of Cheyenne Frontier Days since 1897."

Hall of Fame Inductees

Class of 2020
 Scott Binning
 Monte Blue
 Del Peterson
 Kristie Peterson
 The Schrader Family
 Tom Watson
 French Flash “Bozo” Hawk

Class of 2019
 Terry “Buffie” Bottorff
 Valerie Cegelski-McLeod
 Billy Etbauer
 Painted Valley
 Bud Racicky
 Bob Weaver
 WHEELS

Class of 2018
 Trevor Brazile
 David Johansen
 Jim Lynch
 David “Sammy” McInerney
 O.D. “Jack” Mueller
 J.D. Yates

Class of 2017
 Darrell Barron
 Ote Berry
 Helen Bowen
 Jerry Carter
 Rod Hottle
 James “Jim” Johnson

Class of 2016
 Teresa Jordan
 Ann King
 Jim Mueller
 Duane “Bubba” Roedocker
 Billy Ward
 Cynthia Lummis

Class of 2015
 Spiro “Sam” Contos
 W.E. Dinneen Family
 Reva Gray
 Kay Jessen
 Ty Murray
 Bob Romer
 Dr. Norman Swanson

Class of 2014
 Dr. Frank Barrett
 CFD Western Art Show Committee 1981-2013
 Elizabeth “Liz” Escobedo
 Harrison Halligan
 Ken McCann
 Hank Thompson

Class of 2013
 Albert “Whitey” Christensen
 Tucker Fagan
 Vianna Gurney
 Dick Sherman
 Jeremy Sparks
 Earl Vandehei Family
 The HEELS of Cheyenne Frontier Days

Class of 2012
 Kiwanis Club of Cheyenne
 Marvin Leff
 Romeo Entertainment Group
 James A. Storey Jr.
 Randy Wagner
 William McKinley Wilkinson
 D.R. Whitaker Ranch Families

Class of 2011
 Chuck Baley
 Ray Boeshart
 Ralph Buell
 Carol Farthing
 Margaret Irwin
 Dr. Donald Kougl
 Enid Lummis & Family
 Montie Montana
 William “Obie” Obermeier
 Dick Pickett
 Don Stanfield

Class of 2010
 Tom Bauman
 Garth Brooks
 Floyd Carroll
 Brad Churchill
 Louise Cole
 April & T.V. Jones
 Ronda Mahan
 John Morris
 Kent Rutledge

Class of 2009
 Hadley Barrett
 Buddy Bensmiller
 Shirley Churchill
 Floyd & Diane Humphrey
 Charles “Sharkey” Irwin
 Dean Oliver
 Ned Murray
 Phil Van Horn

Class of 2008
 Guy Allen
 Lynn Beutler
 Crooked Nose
 Clayton Danks
 Irwin Family
 Jack Miller
 W.J. “Jack” Ryan, DDS
 Ace Tyrrell
 Corky Warren
 Senior Steer Ropers Association

Class of 2007
 Willits A. Brewster
 Roy Clark
 Greater Cheyenne Chamber of Commerce
 Buddy Lytle
 John “Jack” Mabee
 Ikua Purdy
 Orville Strandquist
 Tillard Family

Class of 2006
 Bertha Kaepernick Blanchett
 Freckles Brown
 Gene Bryan
 Lou Domenico
 Red Fenwick
 Jim Hearne
 Monty "Hawkeye" Henson
 Linderman Family
 George Michael
 Dr. J.S. Palen
 Tom Powers
 Professional Rodeo Cowboys Association
 Dan Taylor
 Sonny Worrell

Class of 2005
 Walter J. “Buzz” Bradley
 Charles D. Carey, Jr.
 The Denver Post
 Jerry Jessen
 Ben Johnson, Sr.
 Harry Knight
 Don McLaughlin
 Ruby Mercer
 Jim Powers
 Powers Family
 Sally Rand
 Warren Richardson
 Jim Tescher
 Lois Wade
 Mary Weppner
 Fred Whitfield

Class of 2004
 Joe Alexander
 Mary Elizabeth Carpender
 Roy Cooper
 Bill Dubois
 F.E. Warren Air Force Base
 Shirley Flynn
 Rudy Hofmann
 Calvin Jumping Bull
 Dr. Jack Ketcham
 Fred Lowry
 Leonard Mayer
 Merritt Family
 Mr. T
 Wick Peth
 Dan Rees
 Ike Rude
 Joseph Stimson
 George Strait
 Earl Thode
 Lorena Trickey

Class of 2003
 John Bell
 George Bruegman
 Paul Bruegman
 Ora N. “Dutch” Buckles
 Johnny Cash
 John Cole
 E.O. Davis
 Quail Dobbs
 Lane Frost
 Turk Greenough
 Robert “Bob” Hanesworth
 Tuff Hedeman
 C.W. “Charlie” Hirsig
 Hirsig Family
 Chris LeDoux
 Clark McEntire
 Midnight
 Norma Bell Morris
 Mel Potter
 Everett Shaw
 USAF Thunderbirds
 James “J.D” Vandewark
 Harry Vold
 Duane Von Krosigk
 Shoat Webster

Class of 2002
 Princess Blue Water
 Margaret Boice
 Dazee Bristol
 T. Joe Cahill
 Charlie Daniels
 Shawn Davis
 Marietta Dinneen
 Verne Elliott
 Gus Fleischli
 C.B. Irwin
 Arlene Kensinger
 Don Kensinger
 Tad Lucas
 Larry Mahan
 Ed McCarty
 Reba McEntire
 Chuck Parkison
 Wilbur Plaugher
 Jim Shoulders
 Colonel E.A. Slack
 Steamboat
 Edward T. Storey
 Mabel Strickland
 Casey Tibbs
 Union Pacific Railroad

Source:

See also
Cheyenne Frontier Days
Wyoming Transportation Museum

References

External links
The Cheyenne Frontier Days Old West Museum website
The Cheyenne Frontier Days Hall of Fame Inductees website

Museums in Cheyenne, Wyoming
History museums in Wyoming
American West museums in Wyoming
Cowboy halls of fame
Halls of fame in Wyoming
Transportation museums in Wyoming
Museums established in 1978
Rodeo in the United States